Gohar Rasheed (born 2 May 1984) is a Pakistani actor. He is best known for his work in the movie Seedlings, for which he was nominated for best actor in a supporting role at the 2012 New York Film Festival and the 1st ARY Film Awards, and nominated for best actor at the 13th Lux Style Awards. He is also cast in the film, The Legend of Maula Jatt, which released in October 2022.

Early life and education
Rasheed was born in Lahore, Punjab on 2 May 1984. The famous Islamic scholar Ghulam Ahmed Perwez was his maternal grandfather. Rasheed attended Government College University, Lahore and went on to receive his undergraduate degree with majors in theater, film, television and minors in journalism from Beaconhouse National University. Rasheed began his career in theater, which started his career as a successful actor. Before entering cinema, his parents wanted him to join a family business of stock exchange, but Rasheed chose to graduate in entertainment media from BNU, Lahore, and moved to Karachi to pursue studies in media production. He subsequently got a job as a line producer at Hum TV, but he quit after three years there to do theater.

Career

Acting
Rasheed made his theater debut in Bombay Dreams directed and produced by well known theater personality Shah Sharabeel in 2008, where he played an Indian character of Vikram. He then got his first major role in theater version of musical play Moulin Rouge, he played a role of The Duke of Monroth, his performance in this play received by an overwhelming response. He then acted in 2013 political play by Anwar Maqsood and Dawar Mehmood The Sawa 14 August as a General Zia-ul-Haq. He plays Iftekhar in comical play Half Plate by Anwar and Dawar in 2014.

Rasheed also marked his acting career as a supporting character along with Samiya Mumtaz in Daddy, but gets a wider acclaimed in television through drama serial, Shikwa. He then plays Shaukt in Hum TV's blockbuster serial Digest Writer and has appeared in three further serials Goyaa, Khuda Na Karay and Nazdeekiyan. According to Gohar theater and films are his domain, and "TV needs to grow up first, because I am not going to end up with roles that have been done hundreds of times." However, after much praise from Digest Writer Gohar signed three dramas of ARY Digital, Bismil alongside Hareem Farooq and Aitraz (previously entitled Tum Rahay Na Tum) opposite Imran Abbas, Sana Javed and Sania Saeed, and Paiwand, all dramas were aired in late 2015. In 2016, he appeared in Mann Mayal as Meekail with Maya Ali, Hamza Ali Abbasi and Ayesha Khan.

His film credits includes Seedlings and Main Hoon Shahid Afridi both films earned him a wide spread acclaim, Seedlings proves enormous beneficial for him, his acting abilities received highly positive response. His second film Main Hoon Shahid Afridi which holds an ensemble cast also create a milestone in his career, Humayun Saeed offered the role of a passionate cricketer from Sialkot, Kashif Ali a.k.w Kaali Andhi after watching his performance in theater play Moulin Rouge.

In 2013, Gohar was chosen to play the character of Babar, Zeba Bakhtiar's film O21 alongside Bilal Ashraf and Ayaz Samoo as a trio of antagonists. Gohar will star as corrupt SHO Jibroun, alongside Humayun Saeed and Shafqat Cheema in Hamza Ali Abbasi's action-comedy film Kambakht that were scheduled to release in 2015 but was delayed and will appear as Baran in Hassan Waqas Rana's war epic Yalghaar. He is also expected to star in Aamir Mohiuddin's upcoming Film Rangreza alongside Sana Javed and Bilal Ashraf where Gohar will play the role of a dholak player.

Radio
Outside his acting career, Gohar is an active RJ at Radio1 FM91 in Karachi Station and has been doing program called Pakistanwalah.

Filmography

Film

Television

Theater

Radio

Awards and nominations

See also 

 List of Lollywood actors

References

External links 
 
 
 
 
 

1984 births
Government College University, Lahore alumni
Beaconhouse National University alumni
Living people
Pakistani male film actors
Pakistani male television actors
Punjabi people
Male actors from Lahore